Mile End New Town is a former hamlet and then civil parish in the East End of London. Its former area is now part of the London Borough of Tower Hamlets.

History
Following a period of rapid growth it became a hamlet within the large ancient parish of Stepney from 1690, and was split off as a separate ecclesiastical parish in 1841 and civil parish in 1866.

It was grouped into the Whitechapel District in 1855 and became part of the Metropolitan Borough of Stepney in 1900. The parish was abolished in 1921.

Geography
It bordered the parish of Bethnal Green to the north, Whitechapel to the east and south, and Spitalfields to the west. Old Montague Street formed much of the southern boundary; the northern and eastern boundary approximating the East London Railway cutting; and the western boundary falling short of Spital Street. The parish of Mile End Old Town was located some distance to the east, separated from Mile End New Town by the parish of Whitechapel.

References

Areas of London
Districts of the London Borough of Tower Hamlets
History of the London Borough of Tower Hamlets
Parishes united into districts (Metropolis)
Former civil parishes in London